Big Fat Snake is a Danish pop/rock music group that was founded in 1990.

Peter Viskinde and Anders Blichfeldt first met in 1988 for the recording of a demo tape for the band "The Werners" that later changed name to "Verners Verdensorkester" ("Verner's World Orchestra"). The band soon fell apart due to lack of audience. They later formed a new band named after the lyrics of the Bob Dylan song "Wiggle Wiggle" and released their first album "Big Fat Snake" in 1991. Throughout the 90s, they released several records and built up a devoted audience in Denmark.

In 1997, the band's original bass player, Jacob Perbøll, quit the band and was replaced by Asger Steenholdt. In 2003 they recorded a live album, "One Night of Sin", together with the original Elvis Presley TCB Band and The Sweet Inspirations.

On 3 March 2009, it was announced that Peter Viskinde had left the band due to disagreements with the other bands members; in particular, lead singer Anders Blichfeldt. Viskinde then released the album Reel 1 under the Big Fat Snake name, claiming he owned the rights to it. A period of media war ensued, during which there existed two bands with the name. On 16 June 2009, the band name was given to the original band members in an out-of-court settlement, where Viskinde agreed to use another name for his new band. He chose the name Sheriff.

Current members
 Anders Blichfeldt (1990–) vocals and guitar
 Pete Repete (1992–) keyboard
 Jens Fredslund (1992–) drums
 Asger J. Steenholdt (1997–2009) bass (2009–) guitar
 Morten Jay Jakobsen (2009–) bass

Former members
 Peter Viskinde (1990–2009) (died 2021) vocals and guitar
 Jacob Perbøll (1990–1997) bass
 Holger Kølle (1990–1992) drums

Discography

Albums
1991: Big Fat Snake
1992: Born Lucky
1994: Beautiful Thing 
1995: Midnight Mission
1996: Fight for Your Love
1996: Big Boys in Red & White 
1997: Flames
1998: bigfatsnake.com

Live albums

Compilation albums
1999: Recycled

Others
1996: JBL Power Performance (released by JBL/Harman Group as a promotion for their sound systems)
1998: BFS Forever (only released in Asia)
2009: Reel 1 (joint Big Fat Snake / Peter Viskinde album) (Peak DEN: #9)

References

External links
 The band's own website: bigfatsnake.com
 A fan website: snakefan.dk

Danish pop music groups
Danish rock music groups
Musical groups established in 1990